The Russian River Valley AVA is an American Viticultural Area (AVA) in Sonoma County, California. Centered on the Russian River, the Russian River Valley AVA accounts for about one-sixth of the total planted vineyard acreage in Sonoma County. The appellation was granted AVA status in 1983 and enlarged in 2005. The area generally lies between Sebastopol and Santa Rosa in the south, and Forestville and Healdsburg in the north. The Russian River Valley has a characteristically cool climate, heavily affected by fog generated by the valley's proximity to the Pacific Ocean.   The area is known for its success with cool climate varietals, notably Pinot noir and Chardonnay.

Geography and climate

Despite its name, the Russian River Valley AVA does not cover the entire Russian River Valley-which extends north into Mendocino County, California and southwest all the way to the Pacific Ocean. Originally the river continued south and emptied into San Francisco Bay but during its history, for reasons not yet understood by geologists, the river changed course. The small segment of the river valley that makes up the AVA begins near Healdsburg once the river leaves the Alexander Valley region through a narrow gorge in the foothills of the Mayacamas Mountains. From there it extends south to the Santa Rosa Plains and Sebastopol and west to the towns of Monte Rio, Guerneville and Occidental. Within the boundaries of the Russian River AVA are the sub-AVAs Chalk Hill and Sonoma Green Valley.

The geography of the Russian River Valley was shaped millions of years ago by collisions between the North American and Pacific tectonic plates and eruptions by volcanic vents that deposited volcanic ash over layers of eroded bedrock. This created sandstone of loam known as "Goldridge soil". Some of the area's most respected Pinot noir and Chardonnay vineyards are planted along deposits of Goldridge soil. Near the town of Sebastopol, a different soil that is more clay based, known as "Sebastopol soil" has also shown itself to work well with Pinot noir due to its ability to retain less water than Goldridge soil. This soil was created by water flowing off the Sonoma Mountains that carried with it clay deposits. A third soil type, found close to the river, is predominantly alluvial and makes up the benchland regions of the river.

With parts of the AVA located less than 10 miles (16 kilometers) from the Pacific, the climate of the Russian River AVA is characterized by cool morning fog that comes in from the ocean through the Petaluma Gap and burns off during the day. The cooling influence of the fog is responsible for the large diurnal temperature variation with nighttime temperatures dropping as much as 35 to 40 degrees Fahrenheit (about 20 °C) from daytime high. The Russian River is a rain-fed waterway that swells in the wintertime and provides vital irrigation to the region's vineyards during the dry season in late spring. In the summertime, the warmth of the season is tempered by the maritime influence of fog that facilitates a long, slow ripening period and limits the risk of over ripeness or "baked" flavors in the grapes. Harvest in the Russian River Area often take place at later dates than in its neighboring regions. The central and western reaches of the AVA are the coolest and tend to be most extensively planted with Pinot noir and Chardonnay. The eastern parts of the AVA, located near US 101 and include the sub-AVA of Chalk Hill, are the warmest areas of the Russian River AVA being the furthest away from the ocean.

Boundary disputes

The Russian River AVA has had a number of disputes regarding the expansion and revision of the appellation boundaries. In 1997, the Russian River Winegrowers association attempted to expand the AVA all the way down to the town of Cotati in the southeast corner of Sonoma County. This proposal was rejected by the Bureau of Alcohol, Tobacco, Firearms and Explosives for being too broad in scope. In 1999, the grower's association filed a new proposal to revise the boundaries based on the influences of coastal fog. Under this proposal the warmer Chalk Hill sub-AVA, which has little fog influence, would be excluded from the Russian River AVA and more acreage along the southwest corner of the AVA would be added. That proposal was later rejected as well. In 2003, a new proposal was issued expanding the AVA  on the south western end near the Green Valley region. This expansion was approved later that year.

In 2008, E & J Gallo petition for a further expansion of the AVA in the southwestern corner of  that would include the winery's Two Rock Vineyard located along the Highway 101 corridor near Cotati in the AVA. When first proposed, the Russian River Winegrowers Association voted unanimously to oppose the expansion on the grounds that the proposed area is climatically different from the rest of the Russian River areas. Gallo contested that opinion and after changes in leadership the grower's associations officially takes a neutral stance on the proposal though some vocal opposition still exist. As of a meeting of the members on December 9, 2008, the Russian River Winegrowers are opposed the proposed expansion.

History
Viticulture in the Russian River region dates back to the 19th century when immigrants from Mediterranean countries descended upon the region and began planting vines. While most vineyards were "gardens" for personal family consumption, commercial wineries sprung up and by the dawn of the 20th century there were nearly 200 wineries operating. The advent of Prohibition in the United States dealt a devastating blow to the region with many wineries going out of business. Some winemaking families continued to make wine illegally and others converted to bootlegging a sugar and water base wine known as "Jackass brandy" to survive during this period. (Today one of the most prestigious vineyards in the region is the Jackass Hill Vineyard owned by Martinelli Winery.) At the end of Prohibition the few vineyards that were operating would sell their grapes to bulk jug wine producers. It would not be until the 1970s that vineyards in the Russian River region would begin to focus on quality wine production and begin using their grapes for local bottlings. The 1973 vintage of Foppiano Vineyards claims to be the first wines to include the words Russian River on their wine labels. The winery giants of E & J Gallo and Kendall Jackson invested significantly in the region in the late 20th century with Gallo purchasing the large Laguna Ranch vineyard for its flagship "premium" Chardonnay under its Gallo of Sonoma label in 1970 and purchasing the Twin Valley Ranch once owned by actor Fred MacMurray for its MacMurray Ranch label. Gallo's rival Kendall Jackson pumped more than $12 million into updating and establishing its La Crema label in the Russian River region. The Freeman Vineyard & Winery was founded in 2001. 

In 1983, the region was approved for AVA status. Over time the region began to develop a reputation for the quality of its Chardonnay and Pinot Noir for both still and sparkling wine production.

Grape varieties

According to the trade group Russian River Valley Winegrowers, 42 percent of the grapes harvested in the region are chardonnay, while 29 percent are Pinot noir. While the region is predominantly associated with Chardonnay and Pinot noir, hillside vineyard locations have shown success with other varieties such as Syrah and Zinfandel. Within the AVA there are several microclimates that allow for suitable plantings of Sauvignon blanc, Gewürztraminer, Petite Sirah, Cabernet Franc and Merlot. In warmer areas of Chalk Hill there have been successful plantings of Cabernet Sauvignon. Even for these non-Burgundian varietals, the nature of the Russian River Valley's cool climate can be seen in the wine. For example, Russian River Merlots tend to have distinctive tea-like note and Zinfandels tend to exhibit more tart red fruit than Zinfandels from the warmer Dry Creek AVA. While Sauvignon blanc from the region tend to be slightly less "grassy" they still tend to exhibit herbal and citrus lime aroma. Despite its close proximity, the Russian River AVA produces Chardonnays that are dramatically different from those found in the Alexander Valley AVA. The region's cool climate produces more grapes with higher acidity that tend to be more balanced than the fatter, creamy style found in the Alexander Valley. Grapes from the Russian River and smaller Green Valley areas have been prized by sparkling wine producers for their crispness and high quality.

Pinot noir
As of 2008, the Russian River Valley accounted for nearly 19% of all the Pinot noir plantings in California and 10% of all grape varieties planted in Sonoma County. Older clones planted in the mid to late 20th century, including the Martini, Swan, Pommard, and 115 clones, produced a "classic" style of Russian River Pinots that were characterized by vibrant (but pale) color, lively acidity, cherry and berry fruit flavors and delicate aroma that would often include earthy mushroom notes. While that style had it share of fans, the lack of coloring would be a factor in poor score wine ratings from wine critics. In response to these poor scores, some Russian River winemakers altered their techniques in order to enhance the color. These techniques ranged from blending in the darker color Alicante Bouschet and Syrah or the red wine concentrate known as "Mega Purple", to extended maceration and oak extraction that added more weight and extraction of phenolic compounds that add color to the wine. Other winemakers altered some of their viticultural practices in the vineyards, including adopting new trellising systems that allowed for more leaf removal which exposed the grapes to more sunlight. In addition to enhancing some of the color producing phenols, the new trellising also served to increase sugar content (and subsequently alcohol levels) and decrease the amount of the green tasting pyrazine compounds found in the grapes. The style of Pinot noir produced from these techniques tend to be heavier, more fuller bodied and almost "Syrah-like".

References

External links
 Russian River Valley Winegrowers 
 
 Russian River Valley Wine Region and Appellation Sonoma County Tourism

American Viticultural Areas
American Viticultural Areas of California
American Viticultural Areas of the San Francisco Bay Area
Geography of Sonoma County, California
1983 establishments in California